Bertin Nilsson was a Swedish co-founder and chairman of the Swedish Association football club Malmö FF, a post he held between 1914 and 1915.

References

Swedish sports executives and administrators
Malmö FF chairmen